Syllepte neurogramma is a moth in the family Crambidae. It was described by Edward Meyrick in 1939. It is found in the Democratic Republic of the Congo (Katanga Province).

References

Moths described in 1939
neurogramma
Moths of Africa
Endemic fauna of the Democratic Republic of the Congo